The 2004–05 All-Ireland Junior Club Hurling Championship was the second staging of the All-Ireland Junior Club Hurling Championship since its establishment by the Gaelic Athletic Association  in 2002.

The All-Ireland final was played on 28 March 2005 at Croke Park in Dublin, between Galmoy from Kilkenny and Oran from Roscommon, in what was their first ever meeting in the final. Galmoy won the match by 2-18 to 0-09 to claim their first ever All-Ireland title.

Connacht Junior Club Hurling Championship

Connacht final

Leinster Junior Club Hurling Championship

Leinster first round

Leinster quarter-final

Leinster semi-finals

Leinster final

Munster Junior Club Hurling Championship

Munster quarter-finals

Munster semi-finals

Munster final

Ulster Junior Club Hurling Championship

Ulster final

All-Ireland Junior Club Hurling Championship

All-Ireland semi-finals

All-Ireland final

References

All-Ireland Junior Club Hurling Championship
All-Ireland Junior Club Hurling Championship
All-Ireland Junior Club Hurling Championship